Glenn Alden Bass (born April 12, 1939) is a former collegiate and professional American football player.  He played college football at East Carolina University. A flanker, he played professionally in the American Football League for the Buffalo Bills from 1961 through 1966, and for the Houston Oilers in 1966 and 1967.  Bass caught fifty passes for the Bills as a rookie.  He played in five playoffs with the Bills and Oilers, winning three Eastern Division titles (1964–1966) and two American Football League Championships (1964 and 1965) with the Bills, and an Eastern Division crown with the Oilers (1967).

See also
List of American Football League players

1939 births
Living people
People from Wilson, North Carolina
Players of American football from North Carolina
American football wide receivers
East Carolina Pirates football players
Buffalo Bills players
Houston Oilers players
American Football League players